Golchin Robat Karim Football Club is an Iranian football club based in Robat Karim, Iran. They competed in the 2010–11 Iran Football's 2nd Division.

In August, 2011 the license of the club in Iran Football's 2nd Division was bought by Siah Jamegan Khorasan.

Then the club will compete again in Iran Football's 3rd Division.

Season by Season 

The table below shows the achievements of the club in various competitions.

See also
 2011-12 Hazfi Cup
 2011–12 Iran Football's 3rd Division

References

External links 
 

Football clubs in Iran
Association football clubs established in 2003
2003 establishments in Iran